Collective ownership is the ownership of property by all members of a group. The breadth or narrowness of the group can range from a whole society to a set of coworkers in a particular enterprise (such as one collective farm). In the latter (narrower) sense the term is distinguished from common ownership and the commons, which implies open-access, the holding of assets in common, and the negation of ownership as such.

Collective ownership of the means of production is the defining characteristic of socialism, where "collective ownership" can refer to society-wide ownership or to cooperative ownership by an organization's members. When contrasted with public ownership, "collective ownership" commonly refers to group ownership (such as a producer cooperative).

See also 

 Common ownership
 Condominium
 Cooperative
 Market socialism
 Mutualization
 Public ownership
 Social ownership
 Socialism

References 

Cooperatives
Economic systems
Ownership
Socialism